Kyle Albert Goldwin (born 24 April 1985), also known as Chino, is a Gibraltarian former footballer who played as a goalkeeper, most notably for Gibraltar United and Lincoln Red Imps. During his career, he earned 21 caps for the Gibraltar national football team.

Club career
Primarily a futsal player after leaving the Lincoln Red Imps youth teams as a youngster, not much is known about Goldwin's career before 2009, when he joined Sporting Club Gibraltar from Laguna. After 4 years with the club, he joined Gibraltar Premier Division side Glacis United in 2013. Chances were limited as the influx of Spanish players after Gibraltar's admission to UEFA, so in 2014 he moved to the newly revived Gibraltar United. At a club with a philosophy of only signing local players, he became first choice as they earned promotion to the Premier Division at the first attempt. In March 2016, he signed a new long term deal to keep him at Gibraltar United for the foreseeable future. In both 2016 and 2017, he was named in Football Gibraltar's Fans XI at the end of season awards. In July 2019, Chino signed for Lincoln Red Imps, where he had been a youth player in the early 00s. In November 2021, he announced that he would retire from football at the end of the year, with his final match against Bruno's Magpies on 19 December.

International career
Goldwin's impressive form for Gibraltar United saw calls for an international callup begin in late 2015. He was first named in a squad for Gibraltar in March 2016 for the games against Liechtenstein and Latvia, but didn't make his debut until 25 March 2018, when he started in a friendly against Latvia at Victoria Stadium. He played the full 90 minutes and earned a clean sheet as Gibraltar won the game 1–0, a rare win for the country.

On 13 October 2018, Goldwin was in goal as Gibraltar recorded their first competitive win in a 1–0 victory over Armenia in the 2018–19 UEFA Nations League. This marked his second clean sheet in his first four caps. In keeping the clean sheet Goldwin faced 34 shots including nine by Premier League star Henrik Mkhitaryan who was playing for Armenia.

Career statistics

International

Honours
Lincoln Red Imps
Gibraltar National League: 2020–21

References

External links
 

1985 births
Living people
Gibraltarian footballers
Association football goalkeepers
Glacis United F.C. players
Gibraltar United F.C. players
Lincoln Red Imps F.C. players
Gibraltar international footballers
Gibraltar Premier Division players
Gibraltar National League players